Paolo Camossi (born 6 January 1974) is an Italian coach and former triple jumper, best known for his gold medal at the 2001 World Indoor Championships.

From September 2015 he is the coach of Marcell Jacobs.

Biography
Paolo Camossi won four medals, at senior level, at the International athletics competitions. He participated at one edition of the Summer Olympics (2000), he has 19 caps in national team from 1995 to 2006. His personal best was 17.45 metres, achieved in June 2000 in Milan. This result places him third on the all-time Italian performers list, behind Fabrizio Donato.

Statistics

Achievements

National titles
He has won 9 times the individual national championship.
7 wins in the triple jump (1996, 1997, 1998, 1999, 2001, 2003, 2005)
2 wins in the triple jump indoor (1996, 2000)

Palmares as coach of Marcell Jacobs

The meeting with Marcell Jacobs takes place in 2015, when Marcell is only 21 years old, from September of that same year he officially becomes his coach.

See also
 Italian all-time lists - Long jump
 Italian all-time lists - Triple jump

References

External links
 

1974 births
Living people
People from Gorizia
Italian male triple jumpers
Athletes (track and field) at the 2000 Summer Olympics
Athletics competitors of Fiamme Azzurre
Olympic athletes of Italy
Mediterranean Games gold medalists for Italy
Athletes (track and field) at the 1997 Mediterranean Games
World Athletics Championships athletes for Italy
Mediterranean Games medalists in athletics
Italian athletics coaches
World Athletics Indoor Championships winners